Silver Peak is a prominent  mountain located in eastern King County of Washington state. It is set on the crest of the Cascade Range, on land managed by Mount Baker-Snoqualmie National Forest. Silver Peak is situated 4.5 miles southwest of Snoqualmie Pass, and three miles west of Keechelus Lake. The Pacific Crest Trail traverses its east flank and provides easiest access. The nearest higher neighbor is Granite Mountain,  to the north-northwest. Precipitation runoff from the east side of the mountain drains into Cold Creek, a tributary of the Yakima River, whereas the west side of the mountain drains into the South Fork Snoqualmie River via Humpback Creek.

Climate

Silver Peak is located in the marine west coast climate zone of western North America. Most weather fronts originate in the Pacific Ocean, and travel northeast toward the Cascade Mountains. As fronts approach, they are forced upward by the peaks of the Cascade Range, causing them to drop their moisture in the form of rain or snowfall onto the Cascades (Orographic lift). As a result, the west side of the Cascades experiences high precipitation, especially during the winter months in the form of snowfall. During winter months, weather is usually cloudy, but, due to high pressure systems over the Pacific Ocean that intensify during summer months, there is often little or no cloud cover during the summer. Because of maritime influence, snow tends to be wet and heavy, resulting in high avalanche danger. The months July through September offer the most favorable weather for viewing or climbing this peak.

See also

 Geology of the Pacific Northwest

References

External links
Silver Peak Washington Trails Association
 Weather forecast: Silver Peak

Gallery

Mountains of Washington (state)
Mountains of King County, Washington
Mountains of Kittitas County, Washington
Mount Baker-Snoqualmie National Forest